The Christadelphian Isolation League (CIL) is a non-profit organisation run by the Christadelphians. The main object of the organisation is to look after the 'spiritual welfare' of baptised members of the denomination, and their children, who are distant from an ecclesia due to physical distance or illness. It is funded by donations from the Christadelphian community.

History and services
The League was formed in 1928 in the UK. For the first eight years of its existence it dealt only with baptised members from the UK, after which the overseas section was set up. As of 2007 it helps believers in over 100 countries with regional distributors around the globe. There are over 2000 exhortations sent out weekly as well as Bible study guides. Sometimes CIL material is translated into various languages. Since 1959 a newsletter has been produced, the most recent of which ran to 36 pages and contain lessons, poems and current event news. A Sunday School section of the league was started in 1930 (with its own newsletter Chatterbox), a Braille section in 1939 and a service for deaf believers in 2003. There are over 1,500 audio tapes in their library which are available, some of which are being transferred to compact disc to be made more accessible. Occasionally there are events organised specifically for Christadelphians in isolation to meet each other and also members who are not in isolation. In the UK the biggest of these events takes place once every four years in Birmingham, England and there are two annual events - the first, a weekend long event for young people at the Hayes Conference Centre, Swanwick, Derbyshire and the other an 11+ week long equivalent at Ringsfield Hall, Beccles, Suffolk (although this does not include dominantly young people in isolation, it gives primacy to them and acts in the CIL's name), run by the Youth Superintendent of CIL.

External links
Christadelphian Isolation League

Christadelphian organizations
Christian charities based in the United Kingdom
Christian organizations established in 1928